Aleksey Kudryavtsev (born 28 October 1972) is a retired Russian freestyle swimmer, who was affiliated with Profsoyuzy Moskva. He is the father of  three time 2013, 2014 and 2015 World All-Around Rhythmic Gymnastics Gold Medalists  Yana Kudryavtseva.

Kudryavtsev is best known for winning the gold medal in the Men's 4 × 200 m Freestyle event at the 1992 Summer Olympics at Barcelona, alongside Vladimir Pyshnenko, Dmitry Lepikov, Veniamin Tayanovich, Yury Mukhin (heats) and Yevgeny Sadovyi. He just swam in the preliminary heats.

References
 

1972 births
Living people
Russian male swimmers
Soviet male swimmers
Olympic swimmers of the Unified Team
Swimmers at the 1992 Summer Olympics
Olympic gold medalists for the Unified Team
Swimmers from Moscow
Russian male freestyle swimmers
Medalists at the 1992 Summer Olympics
Olympic gold medalists in swimming